Lucy Peppiatt is a British theologian and author who has been Principal of Westminster Theological Centre since 2013.

Education
Lucy Peppiatt has bachelor's degrees in English Literature from the University of Birmingham (1987) and in Theology from the University of London (2003). She completed an MA in Systematic Theology from King's College London in 2005. In 2011, she completed a PhD from the University of Otago in New Zealand, with a dissertation titled Spirit Christology and Mission supervised by Prof. Murray Rae.

Career
Peppiatt is a licensed lay minister in the Church of England and has pastored churches alongside her husband in Harare, Zimbabwe and Netherthorpe, Sheffield. She identifies as an evangelical charismatic. She is "Theologian in Residence" at Crossnet Church, Bristol and serves on the Leadership Team. She was a Member of Theological Advisory Group to Evangelical Alliance UK from 2014 – 2019 and Vice-Chair from 2017-2019.

Peppiatt was appointed in 2010 to the position of lecturer in systematic theology at WTC (Westminster Theological Centre), a non-denominational Hub-based theological college with its central office based in Cheltenham, Gloucestershire. She became Dean of Studies in 2011 and has been the Principal of WTC since 2013. Under Peppiatt’s leadership the college has been reoriented to serve, primarily, the independent church constituency in the UK who have no dedicated theological colleges. She lectures in systematic theology.

Peppiatt's research interests include the Trinity, charismatic theology, discipleship, and 1 Corinthians. She has written a number of articles and books about women in the Bible and the church, and Paul the Apostle and women, paying particular attention to traditionally hierarchal views and the problems that arise from them. Peppiatt contends that a careful reading of 1 Corinthians 11-14 reveals that Paul’s discussion of women is intended to refute the patriarchal views held by male Christians in Corinth. She is regularly engaged as a speaker in both church and academic contexts.

Personal life
Peppiatt is married to Nick Crawley, an Anglican minister and creator of Bible for Life. They have four sons, Seth, Harry, Roscoe and Jem.

Selected publications

Books

Articles and chapters

Classes
 In partnership with BibleProject’s online Classroom, Dr. Peppiatt taught a class on 1 Corinthians available for free here.

References

External links
 

Year of birth missing (living people)
Living people
Alumni of the University of Birmingham
Alumni of the University of London
Alumni of King's College London
University of Otago alumni
Systematic theologians
English Anglican theologians
Heads of colleges in the United Kingdom